Justinian Povey (d. 1652), held office as Auditor of the Exchequer and administrator for Anne of Denmark.

Justinian Povey was the son of John Povey, an embroiderer in London. His sister Joan married William Angell, a fishmonger. A brother, John Povey, became the owner of Lauderdale House at Highgate.

In 1617 Povey audited an account of jewels supplied to Anne of Denmark by George Heriot. He was listed as a member of the household of Anne of Denmark as auditor-general in 1619.

Povey became auditor for Henrietta Maria and Keeper of the Woods in Yorkshire for Charles I.

In 1641 Povey was living on Aldersgate in London. He also owned The Priory at Hounslow.

In 1641 he was asked for evidence of the institution of a Queen's Court, concerning the property and revenues of English queens consort, and also as a court of equity, dealing with legal matters. Povey indicated the existence of documents relating to Anne of Denmark's revenue only, with a red vellum bound book of papers.

Family
Justinian Povey married Beatrix Stanley, the daughter of John Stanley of Roydon Hall, Essex, and Beatrix daughter of Henry Dynne of Heydon, Norfolk, an Auditor of the Exchequer. Their children included:
 John Povey
 William Povey, married Francis Sherborne (b. 1624).
 Thomas Povey, Member of Parliament.
 Anne Povey (b. 1615), married William Blathwayt at Hounslow in 1642, and secondly Thomas Vivian.

Sir John Povey, Lord Chief Justice of Ireland, was a close relative: his branch of the family settled at Market Drayton in Shropshire.

References

1652 deaths
Household of Anne of Denmark